EJF may refer to:

 Environmental Justice Foundation, an international environmental organization
 Ethiopian Journalists Forum
 European Jewish Fund